"El Preso" (translation "the prisoner") is a song recorded by Fruko y sus Tesos. It was released in 1975 with vocals by Wilson Saoko. The song was composed by the band's percussionist Álvaro Velásquez.

The lyrics are the narration of a prisoner ("preso") serving 30 years. The actual inspiration for songwriter Velásquez was a friend's letter describing another friend's pain being jailed for 30 years on a drug charge. In an interview, Julio Ernesto Estrada (aka Fruko) said it "became a world anthem of salsa music". 

Radio Nacional de Colombia also called the song a "universal hymn of salsa." 

The song has also been recognized as one of the greatest Colombian songs of all time by multiple media sources:

 In its list of the ten most iconic Colombian songs, El Nuevo Siglo, rated La Pollera Colorá at No. 10.

 It was selected by Hip Latina in 2017 as one of the "13 Old School Songs Every Colombian Grew Up Listening To"; the publication wrote that "the infectious beat will have you dancing quite freely."  

 In its list of the 50 best Colombian songs of all time, El Tiempo, Colombia's most widely circulated newspaper, ranked the song at No. 41.

It was selected by Billboard in 2018 as one of the "15 Best Salsa Songs Ever".

References

Colombian songs
Salsa songs
Joe Arroyo songs
Songs about prison